Gosti iz budushchego (lit.: Guests from the Future) was a Russian dance-pop group, which existed since 1996 until 2009. It was formed by the singer Eva Polna and musician Yuri Usachyov. The band reached high positions in Russian music charts with several songs and albums.

In spring of 2009 Eva Polna announced split-up of the group and her new solo career.

Discography 

Studio albums
 Через сотни лет… (1997)
 Время песок... (1998)
 Беги от меня (1999)
 Зима в сердце (2000)
 Это сильнее меня, часть 1 (2000)
 Ева (2002)
 Это сильнее меня, часть 2 (2003)
 Больше чем песни (2005)
 За звездой (2007)

Compilations
 Best (2001)
 Любовное настроение (2003)

Remix albums
 Правила движения (2004)
 Реальна только музыка (2007)

References

External links
Info on Discogs

Russian pop music groups
Musical groups established in 1996
Musical groups disestablished in 2009
Russian musical duos
Pop music duos
Male–female musical duos